The Tarumã Mirim River is a river in the state of  Amazonas, Brazil.
It is a left tributary of the Rio Negro, which it enters west of the city of Manaus.

Course

The Tarumã Mirim drains the west part of the Tarumã Açu – Tarumã Mirim section of the Rio Negro Left Bank Environmental Protection Area (APA), which is mainly covered by dense rainforest but has areas of open tropical forest and campinarana.
It separates the APA from the Puranga Conquista Sustainable Development Reserve to the west.

The Tarumã-Açu and Tarumã Mirim are blackwater rivers, acidic and low in minerals.

See also
List of rivers of Amazonas

Notes

Sources

Rio Negro (Amazon)
Rivers of Amazonas (Brazilian state)